The 2018 WAKO World Cadet & Juniors Kickboxing Championships was held at the Palazzo del Turismo in Jesolo, Italy and took place between 15 and 23 September 2018.
Fighters between 10 and 18 years old of age, coming from 64 countries competed in all the kickboxing disciplines, three ring sports (Full contact, Low Kick and K-1) and four tatami sports (Point Fighting, Light Contact, Kick Light and Musical Forms).

Overall Medals Standing (Top 5) 
The top nation at the 2018 WAKO World Cadet & Juniors Kickboxing Championships in Jesolo (Italy) was Russia.

References

WAKO Amateur World Championships events